Super Bowl VI was an American football game between the National Football Conference (NFC) champion Dallas Cowboys and the American Football Conference (AFC) champion Miami Dolphins to decide the National Football League (NFL) champion for the 1971 season. The Cowboys defeated the Dolphins by the score of 24–3, to win their first Super Bowl. The game was played on January 16, 1972, at Tulane Stadium in New Orleans, Louisiana, the second time the Super Bowl was played in that city. Despite the southerly location, it was unseasonably cold at the time, with the kickoff air temperature of  making this the coldest Super Bowl played.

Dallas, in its second Super Bowl appearance, entered the game with a reputation of not being able to win big playoff games such as Super Bowl V and the 1966 and 1967 NFL Championship Games prior to the 1970 AFL–NFL merger. They posted an 11–3 record during the 1971 regular season before defeating the Minnesota Vikings and the San Francisco 49ers in the playoffs. The Dolphins were making their first Super Bowl appearance after building a 10–3–1 regular season record, including eight consecutive wins, and posting postseason victories over the Kansas City Chiefs and the Baltimore Colts.

The Cowboys dominated Super Bowl VI, setting Super Bowl records for the most rushing yards (252), the most first downs (23), and the fewest points allowed (3). For the next 47 years, they would be the only team to prevent their opponent from scoring a touchdown in the Super Bowl, a feat matched by the 2018 New England Patriots in Super Bowl LIII and again by the 2020 Tampa Bay Buccaneers in Super Bowl LV. The game was close in the first half, with the Cowboys only leading 10–3 at halftime. But Dallas opened the third quarter with a 71-yard, 8-play touchdown drive, and then Dallas linebacker Chuck Howley's 41-yard interception return in the fourth quarter set up another score. Cowboys quarterback Roger Staubach, who completed 12 out of 18 passes for 119 yards, threw 2 touchdown passes, and rushed 5 times for 18 yards, was named the Super Bowl's Most Valuable Player.

This was the last Super Bowl to be blacked out in the TV market in which the game was played. Under the NFL's unconditional blackout rules at the time, the Super Bowl could not be broadcast locally even if the local team did not advance to the Super Bowl, and it was a sellout. The following year, the league changed their rules to allow games to be broadcast in the local market if sold out 72 hours in advance. It was the last Super Bowl played with the hashmarks (also called the inbound lines) set at 40 feet apart (20 yards from the sidelines), and the last NFL game overall; the next season, they were brought in to 18 feet, the width of the goalposts, where they remain.

Background
The NFL awarded Super Bowl VI to New Orleans on March 23, 1971 at the owners meetings held in Palm Beach, Florida. Six cities submitted bids: Miami, Dallas, Jacksonville, New Orleans, Los Angeles, and Houston. It took fourteen ballots to finally select a winner. Miami and Dallas emerged as the heavy favorites. After thirteen deadlocked votes, support for both Dallas and Miami eroded after owners including Al Davis and Billy Sullivan noted that the Cowboys and Dolphins both were both favorites to reach the Super Bowl. They argued against a team having a potential competitive advantage of a home game for the Super Bowl. Owners compromised on the 14th vote and selected New Orleans. City representatives, namely those from Miami, argued that future votes involve awarding multiple Super Bowl sites at the same meeting. They also floated the idea of rotating the host city between AFC and NFC cities annually. This would provide the hosts with greater preparation time, and prevent them from having to prepare bids every year. The idea to vote on multiple Super Bowls was implemented the following year, but the AFC/NFC rotation was never implemented.

Dallas Cowboys

The Cowboys entered the season still having the reputation of "not being able to win the big games" and "next year's champion". The Super Bowl V loss added more fuel to that widely held view. As in the previous season, Dallas had a quarterback controversy as Staubach and Craig Morton alternated as starting quarterback (in a loss to the Bears in game 7, Morton and Staubach alternated plays). The Cowboys were 4–3 at the season midpoint, including a 24–14 loss to the New Orleans Saints at Tulane Stadium. But after head coach Tom Landry settled on Staubach, the Cowboys won their last seven regular season games to finish with an 11–3 record.

Staubach finished the regular season as the NFL's top rated passer (101.8) by throwing for 1,882 yards, 15 touchdowns, and only 4 interceptions. He was also a terrific rusher, gaining 343 yards and 2 touchdowns on 41 carries. Dallas also had an outstanding trio of running backs, Walt Garrison, Duane Thomas, and Calvin Hill, who rushed for a combined total of 1,690 yards and 14 touchdowns during the season. Garrison led the team in receptions during the season (40). (Thomas, upset that the Cowboys would not renegotiate his contract after his excellent rookie year, had stopped talking to the press and to almost everyone on the team). Wide Receivers Bob Hayes and Lance Alworth also provided a deep threat, catching a combined total of 69 passes for 1,327 yards and 10 touchdowns. The offensive line, anchored by all-pro tackle Rayfield Wright, Pro Bowlers John Niland and Ralph Neely, and future Hall of Famer Forrest Gregg, was also a primary reason for their success on offense.  Neely had broken his leg in November in a dirt-bike accident, and was replaced first by Gregg and then by Tony Liscio, who came out of retirement.

The Dallas defense (nicknamed the "Doomsday Defense") had given up only one touchdown in the last 14 quarters prior to the Super Bowl. Their defensive line was anchored by Pro Bowl defensive tackle Bob Lilly, who excelled at pressuring quarterbacks and breaking up running plays. Dallas also had an outstanding trio of linebackers: Pro Bowler Chuck Howley, who recorded 5 interceptions and returned them for 122 yards; Dave Edwards 2 interceptions; and Lee Roy Jordan, who recorded 2 interceptions. The Cowboys secondary was led by 2 future Hall of Fame cornerbacks Herb Adderley (6 interceptions for 182 return yards) and Mel Renfro (4 interceptions for 11 yards). Safeties Cliff Harris and Pro Bowler Cornell Green combined for 4 interceptions.  Harris added 29 kickoff returns for 823 yards, an average of 28.4 yards per return (3rd in the NFL). They were also helped out by weak side linebacker D.D. Lewis.

Miami Dolphins

The Dolphins, who advanced to the Super Bowl just five years after their founding in 1966, were based primarily around their league-leading running attack, led by running backs Larry Csonka and Jim Kiick. Csonka rushed for 1,051 yards, averaging over five yards per carry, and scored seven touchdowns. Versatile Jim Kiick rushed for 738 yards and three touchdowns, and was second on the Dolphins in receiving with 40 receptions for 338 yards. They fumbled once (by Kiick) between the two of them during the regular season. But Miami also had a threatening passing game. Quarterback Bob Griese, the AFC's leading passer and most valuable player, put up an impressive performance during the season, completing 145 passes for 2,089 yards and 19 touchdowns with only 9 interceptions. Griese's major weapon was wide receiver Paul Warfield, who caught 43 passes for 996 yards (a 23.2 yards per catch average) and a league-leading 11 touchdowns. The Dolphins also had an excellent offensive line to open up holes for their running backs and protect Griese on pass plays, led by future Hall of Fame guard Larry Little.

Miami's defense was a major reason why the team built a 10–3–1 regular season record, including eight consecutive wins. Future Hall of Fame linebacker Nick Buoniconti was a major force reading and stopping plays, while safety Jake Scott recorded 7 interceptions and led the NFL in punt return yards with 318.

Playoffs

Before this season, the Dolphins had never won a playoff game in franchise history, but they surprised the entire NFL by advancing to the Super Bowl with wins against the two previous Super Bowl champions. The Dolphins became the first of the four teams which had commenced play in the NFL or AFL after the start of the Super Bowl era to contest so much as a title game, let alone earn a berth in the world championship game.

First Miami defeated the Kansas City Chiefs (winners of Super Bowl IV), 27–24, in the longest game in NFL history with kicker Garo Yepremian's game-winning field goal after 22 minutes and 40 seconds of overtime play in the final Chiefs game at Municipal Stadium. Later, Miami shut out the defending Super Bowl champion Baltimore Colts, 21–0, in the AFC Championship Game, with safety Dick Anderson intercepting 3 passes from Colts quarterback Johnny Unitas and returning one of them for a 62-yard touchdown.

Meanwhile, the Cowboys marched to the Super Bowl with playoff wins over the Minnesota Vikings, 20–12 in the NFC Divisional Playoffs, and the San Francisco 49ers, 14–3 in the NFC Championship Game, giving up only one touchdown in the two games.

Super Bowl pregame news and notes
Soon after the Dolphins' win in the AFC Championship Game, Shula received a phone call at his home from President Richard Nixon at 1:30 in the morning. Nixon had a play he thought would work, a particular pass to Warfield. (That particular play, which was called late in the first quarter, was broken up by Mel Renfro.)

When asked about the Dolphins' defensive team prior to Super Bowl VI, Landry said that he could not recall any of the players' names, but they were a big concern to him. Over the years this remark has been regarded as the origin of the nickname "No-Name Defense".  However, it was Miami defensive coordinator Bill Arnsparger who had originally given his squad the nickname after the Dolphins had beaten the Baltimore Colts in the AFC Championship.

According to Tom Landry, the Cowboys were very confident. "When they talked among themselves they said there was no way they were going to lose that game."

The Cowboys used the New Orleans Saints' practice facility in Metairie as its training headquarters for the game. The Dolphins split their practices between Tulane Stadium and Tad Gormley Stadium in New Orleans' City Park. Dallas' team hotel was the Hilton across from New Orleans International Airport in Kenner, and Miami lodged at the Fontainebleau Motor Hotel in New Orleans' Mid-City neighborhood.

On Media Day, Duane Thomas refused to answer any questions and sat silently until his required time was up. Roger Staubach surmises that Duane Thomas would have been named MVP if he had cooperated with the press prior to the game. In the Cowboys' locker room after the game, flustered CBS reporter Tom Brookshier asked Duane Thomas a long-winded question, the gist of which was "You're fast, aren't you?" Thomas, who had shunned the press all season, simply said "Evidently." Thomas became the first player to score touchdowns in back-to-back Super Bowls, having a receiving touchdown in Super Bowl V.

Dolphins safety Jake Scott entered Super Bowl VI with a broken left hand. He broke his right wrist during the game but never came out. With both hands in casts for three months, he said "When I go to the bathroom, that's when I find out who my real friends are."

This was the first Super Bowl to match two teams which played its home games on artificial turf. Both of the Cowboys' home stadiums of 1971, the Cotton Bowl and Texas Stadium, had turf, as did the Dolphins' Orange Bowl (specifically Poly-Turf). The previous year, the Cowboys became the first team to play its home games on turf to make it to a Super Bowl.

Through Super Bowl LVII, this is the only Super Bowl in which both teams played their home games in states which were members of the Confederate States of America during the Civil War. The Washington Commanders (known as the Redskins from 1937-2019) which faced the Dolphins in Super Bowl VII and Super Bowl XVII, has its facilities and training camp in Virginia, which was a Confederate state during the Civil War, but have never played home games there, moving from Washington, D.C. proper to Maryland in 1997.

This game was originally scheduled to be the last to be played in Tulane Stadium. It was hoped the Louisiana Superdome would be ready in time for the 1972 NFL season. However, political wrangling led to a lengthy delay in construction, and groundbreaking did not take place until August 11, 1971, five months before this game. The Superdome was not completed until August 1975, forcing Super Bowl IX to be moved to Tulane Stadium. That Super Bowl proved to be the final NFL game in the stadium, which was demolished in late 1979.

The night before the game, Joe Frazier successfully defended his heavyweight boxing championship with a fourth-round knockout of Terry Daniels at the Rivergate Convention Center, which was approximately one mile south of the construction site for the Superdome on Poydras Street. The next day, the Rivergate hosted a closed-circuit television broadcast of the game, charging $10 per person.

The temperature at kickoff was a sunny and windy , making this the coldest Super Bowl to date.

Broadcasting
The game was broadcast in the United States by CBS with play-by-play announcer Ray Scott and color commentator Pat Summerall. Although Tulane Stadium was sold out for the game, unconditional blackout rules in the NFL prohibited the live telecast from being shown in the New Orleans area. This was the last Super Bowl to be blacked out in the TV market in which the game was played. The game was not blacked out in Baton Rouge, which was blacked out during Saints home games.

The following year, the NFL allowed Super Bowl VII to be televised live in the host city (Los Angeles) when all tickets were sold. In , the league changed its blackout policy to allow any game to be broadcast in the home team's market if sold out 72 hours in advance. The blackout rule has been suspended since .

This game was featured in the movie Where the Buffalo Roam where the protagonist character Hunter S. Thompson is sent to cover the game by Rolling Stone magazine, although the host site set in the movie is Los Angeles Memorial Coliseum (site of Super Bowl VII), not Tulane Stadium.

Except for a portion of the Cowboys first scoring drive and the Dolphins only scoring drive (both drives ended with field goals), the complete original broadcast exists.

Entertainment

The Tyler Junior College Apache Belles drill team performed during the pregame and halftime festivities. Later, the U.S. Air Force Academy Chorale sang the national anthem.  This was followed by an eight-plane flyover of F-4 Phantoms from Eglin Air Force Base, which featured a plane in the missing man formation.

Despite being the second Super Bowl after the AFL–NFL merger, Super Bowl VI was the first one to have the NFL logo painted at the 50-yard line. The NFL would do this for all but one Super Bowl after this until Super Bowl XXXI (the exception was Super Bowl XXV, when the Super Bowl logo was painted at midfield instead).

Halftime show

The Super Bowl VI halftime show was themed as a "Salute to Louis Armstrong" (Armstrong, a New Orleans native, died in July 1971). Headlining the show were jazz singer Ella Fitzgerald, actress and singer Carol Channing, trumpeter Al Hirt and the U.S. Marine Corps Drill Team. Also performing were the Onward Brass Band with Danny Barker, and young Leroy Jones as "Little Louis Armstrong".

Fitzgerald was the first Black woman to sing in a Super Bowl halftime show. She is also considered to be the first jazz artist featured in such a manner in a Super Bowl halftime show.

This was the second of three Super Bowl halftime shows in which Al Hirt was a headlining performer. Hirt had previously been among the headlining performers in the halftime shows of Super Bowl I, and would subsequently be a headlining performer in the halftime show of Super Bowl XII. Also returning to the Super Bowl halftime stage was Carol Channing, who had previously been a performer in the halftime show of Super Bowl IV.

In the show, the Onward Brass Band performed "High Society" and accompanied Carol Channing in performing "Hello, Dolly!". Al Hirt accompanied Ella Fitzgerald in performing "Mack the Knife".

Game summary

According to Roger Staubach, the Cowboys' game plan was to neutralize the Dolphins' key offensive and defensive players—Paul Warfield and Nick Buoniconti. Warfield was double-teamed by Green and Renfro. "They pretty much shut him down", wrote Staubach. Since the running game was the key to the Cowboys' offense, they wanted to take the quick-reacting Buoniconti out of each play. Two linemen, usually Niland and center Dave Manders, were assigned to block Buoniconti. Combined with counterplays and the excellent cutback running of Thomas, this tactic proved very successful. Buoniconti sustained a concussion which he suffered from throughout the second half, during which he did not keep track of the score, thinking it was still 10-3 when it had become 24-3.

Miami's defense was designed to stop Staubach's scrambling. According to Staubach, although his scrambing was shut down this did not work to the Dolphins' benefit because it opened things up for the other backs.

First quarter
Miami won the coin toss and elected to receive. Neither team could mount a drive on its first possession. On the first play of the Dolphins' second possession, Larry Csonka, on his first carry of the game, gained 12 yards on a sweep aided by a big block
by Larry Little on Herb Adderley. That would be his longest gain of the day. On the next play, Csonka fumbled a handoff from Bob Griese, his first fumble of the season, and it was recovered by linebacker Chuck Howley at the Cowboys 48-yard line.  A pair of runs for 18 total yards by Walt Garrison put Dallas within field goal range, but Staubach was sacked by Jim Riley and Bob Heinz for a 12-yard loss. However, Staubach found Bob Hayes open for an 18-yard pass and then Staubach passed to Duane Thomas for 11 yards to bring up first and goal. On third and goal, Dick Anderson made a great play to keep Thomas out of the end zone. Dallas kicker Mike Clark kicked a 9-yard field goal to give the Cowboys a 3–0 lead.

On the third play of the Dolphins' next possession at their own 38-yard line, Griese was sacked by Bob Lilly for a Super Bowl record 29-yard loss, which still stands as the longest negative play from scrimmage in Super Bowl history.

Second quarter
Early in the second quarter, Miami drove to the Cowboys 42-yard line with the aid of a 20-yard reception by receiver Howard Twilley, but the drive stalled and ended with no points after kicker Garo Yepremian missed a 49-yard field goal attempt.

Starting with 6:15 left in the period, Dallas drove 76 yards in 10 plays, including a 21-yard reception by Lance Alworth and Calvin Hill's three carries for 25 yards, and then scored on a 7-yard touchdown pass from Staubach to Alworth to increase their lead to 10–0 (Alworth would refer to the receptions that he made on the scoring drive as "The two most important catches of his career"). Miami started the ensuing drive with just 1:15 left in the half, and quarterback Bob Griese completed three consecutive passes, two to receiver Paul Warfield and one to running back Jim Kiick, for 44 total yards to reach the Dallas 24-yard line. On the next play Griese threw to Warfield, who was open at the 2-yard line, but the ball was deflected by Green and bounced off Warfield's chest. Miami had to settle for Yepremian's 31-yard field goal to cut the Dolphins deficit to 10–3 going into halftime.

Third quarter
But Dallas dominated the second half, preventing any chance of a Miami comeback. Dallas reasoned that Miami would make adjustments to stop the Cowboys' inside running game which had been so successful in the first half. So the Cowboys decided to run outside. The Cowboys opened the third period with a 71-yard, 8-play drive, which included four runs by Thomas for 37 yards, a reverse by Hayes for 16 yards, and only one pass, scoring on Thomas' 3-yard sweep to make the score 17–3. This seemed to fire up the Dallas defense, who managed to prevent Miami from getting a single first down in the entire third quarter. The farthest advance Miami had in the third quarter was to its own 42-yard line as Griese and the offense were, as Don Shula put it, "destroyed." On an incomplete pass, Jake Scott hit Roger Staubach on a blitz that shook him up late in the third quarter, but Staubach returned in the fourth.

Fourth quarter
Miami managed to advance to midfield early in the final period, opening the fourth quarter with their first third down conversion of the game. Howley ended the drive, however, by intercepting a pass from Griese intended for Kiick in the flat. After returning the ball 41 yards, Howley tripped and fell at the Dolphins 9-yard line with no one near him. He then got up and spiked the ball out of frustration for not scoring a touchdown. But three plays later, Staubach threw a 7-yard touchdown pass to tight end Mike Ditka, increasing the Dallas lead to 24–3 with twelve minutes left in the game.

Miami began their next possession at their own 23-yard line and mounted only their third sustained drive of the game, reaching the Dallas 16-yard line in six plays. However, Griese fumbled the snap and the ball was recovered by Cowboys left end Larry Cole at the 20-yard line. The Cowboys then mounted an eleven-play drive to the Miami 1-yard line which featured just one pass and a fake field goal attempt on fourth-and-one at the Miami 20-yard line (it should be noted the victory formation, where the quarterback kneels to run down the clock, was not introduced in the NFL until late in the 1978 season following the Miracle at the Meadowlands). However, on first-and-goal at the 1-yard line, Hill fumbled while attempting to dive across the goal line, and the ball was recovered at the 4-yard line by Dolphins defensive tackle Manny Fernandez with just under two minutes left. Miami then ran four meaningless plays to end the game.

Aftermath
Staubach became the first quarterback of a winning team in the Super Bowl to play the entire game. Wrote Staubach, "I can say that I don't think I ever felt any better as an athlete than how I felt after that game..." Nick Buoniconti wrote, "I was knocked senseless...The Cowboys seemed to be moving so much faster than we were....We were overmatched psychologically as well as physically." Jim Kiick said, "Dallas wasn't that much better, but football is momentum. We lost it in the first quarter when we fumbled and they scored, and we never got it back." Said the Dolphins' Howard Twilley:

It's so hard to figure. We went in confident. We really thought we'd win and win handily. Something happened, though, during the week. I guess it was that week. The week has its own momentum, like nothing we'd been in before...[Shula] said we'd been embarrassed. He said we didn't even compete....That's the sickest feeling I've ever had.

Said Cornell Green, "The difference between the Dolphins and Cowboys was that the Dolphins were just happy to be in the game and the Cowboys came to win the game.".

Griese completed the same amount of passes as Staubach (12), and threw for 15 more yards (134), but threw no touchdown passes and was intercepted once. Csonka and Kiick were held to just 80 combined rushing yards (40 yards each), scored no touchdowns, and lost 1 fumble on 19 carries. Warfield was the game's leading receiver, but was limited to just 4 receptions for 39 yards. Thomas was the top rusher of the game with 19 carries for 95 yards and a touchdown. He also caught 3 passes for 17 yards. Dallas running back Walt Garrison added 74 rushing yards and caught 2 passes for 11 yards.

The Dallas Cowboys became the first team to win the Super Bowl after losing it the previous year.  The Miami Dolphins would duplicate this feat the following season by winning Super Bowl VII.  This would be the only game the Dolphins would lose in 1972, going undefeated the next season prior to their Super Bowl VII win. Miami's 3 points scored set a Super Bowl record in scoring futility, which was tied by the Los Angeles Rams in Super Bowl LIII in 2019. The Kansas City Chiefs also failed to score a touchdown in their 31-9 loss to the Tampa Bay Buccaneers in Super Bowl LV in February 2021.

Box score

Final statistics
Sources:The NFL's Official Encyclopedic History of Professional Football, (1973), p. 153, Macmillan Publishing Co. New York, LCCN 73-3862, NFL.com Super Bowl VI, Super Bowl VI Play Finder Dal, Super Bowl VI Play Finder Mia, Super Bowl VI Play by Play

Statistical comparison

Individual statistics

1Completions/attempts
2Carries
3Long gain
4Receptions
5Times targeted

Records set
The following records were set or tied in Super Bowl VI, according to the official NFL.com boxscore and the ProFootball reference.com game summary. Some records have to meet NFL minimum number of attempts to be recognized. The minimums are shown (in parenthesis).

 † This category includes rushing, receiving, interception returns, punt returns, kickoff returns, and fumble returns.
 ‡ Sacks an official statistic since Super Bowl XVII by the NFL. Sacks are listed as "Tackled Attempting to Pass" in the official NFL box score for Super Bowl III.

Turnovers are defined as the number of times losing the ball on interceptions and fumbles.

Starting lineups
Source:

Officials
 Referee: Jim Tunney #32, first Super Bowl
 Umpire: Joe Connell #57, first Super Bowl
 Head Linesman: Al Sabato #10, second Super Bowl (I)
 Line Judge: Art Holst #33, first Super Bowl
 Back Judge: Ralph Vandenberg #47, first Super Bowl
 Field Judge: Bob Wortman #84, first Super Bowl 
 Alternate Referee: Bernie Ulman #6, worked Super Bowl I as head linesman
 Alternate Umpire: Tony Sacco #18, did not work Super Bowl on the field during career

All on-field officials except Vandenberg were on the crew for Super Bowl XII, the first Super Bowl at the Superdome. 

Bernie Ulman was the referee for Super Bowl IX, the last professional football game played at Tulane Stadium. 

Note: A seven-official system was not used until the  season

Notes

References

External links

 
 Super Bowl official website
 Super Bowl play-by-plays from USA Today (Last accessed September 28, 2005)
 All-Time Super Bowl Odds from The Sports Network (Last accessed October 16, 2005)

Further reading
 
 
 
 

1971 National Football League season
1972 in American football
1972 in sports in Louisiana
American football competitions in New Orleans
Dallas Cowboys postseason
Miami Dolphins postseason
Super Bowl
January 1972 sports events in the United States
1970s in New Orleans